Reihhard Keith Doms (April 24, 1920 – September 26, 2009) was an American librarian. Doms served as president of the American Library Association from 1970 to 1971 and was director of the Free Library of Philadelphia from 1969 to 1987. Born in Endeavor, Wisconsin, Doms attended the University of Wisconsin–Madison where he received degrees in French and library science. During World War II, he served in the Army Signal Corps' Intelligence Service. The Army also sent him to Harvard University to study Mandarin.

Prior to moving to Philadelphia in 1969, Doms was assistant director and then director of the Carnegie Library of Pittsburgh. Doms served as Director of the Free Library of Philadelphia from 1969 to 1987. He was known for incorporating progressive technologies in their libraries. In a 1971 article in American Libraries, Dom stated: "In ten years the majority of young people will be comfortable with and very much skilled in the use of both print and nonprint media… The librarians of this nation must prepare themselves and their institutions to be as fully responsive to the expectations of the next generation as is possible."

Doms also held leadership positions in Concord, New Hampshire, and Midland, Michigan. After his retirement in Philadelphia, he became Director of the Urban Libraries Council in 1987. Doms died at his home in State College, Pennsylvania on September 26, 2009.

References

 

1920 births
2009 deaths
People from Marquette County, Wisconsin
Military personnel from Wisconsin
Presidents of the American Library Association
American librarians
University of Wisconsin–Madison College of Letters and Science alumni
University of Wisconsin–Madison School of Library and Information Studies alumni